The Lithuanian Evangelical Reformed Church is a Calvinist denomination in Lithuania which uses a presbyterian polity.

History 
The church was founded on December 14, 1557, during the Synod of Vilnius. The General synod met annually in Lithuania from that date. Started with 2 later grew to six districts Synods. The church's Latin name is the " Unitas Lithuaniae " shortly UL. It sent its representatives to the Polish-Lithuanian Commonwealth. But the UL was an independent denomination. The parish network covered all parts of the Grand Duchy of Lithuania. The first superintendent was Szymon Zacjusz. In 1565, the anti-trinitarian Lithuanian brotherhood separated from the Calvinist church.

Parishes were in Vilnius, Biržai, Švobiškis (Pasvays region); Nemunėlio Radviliškis (Biržai region); Salamiestis (Kupiškis region)  Kėdainiai, Slutsk, Dzyarzhynsk (Koydanava), Zabłudów and later in Izabelin. Before World War II, the church had 10,000 believers; in 2012 it had approximately 7,000 in 14 congregations.
In 1922 the denomination become a member of the World Communion of Reformed Churches.

Theology 
The church adheres to the Sandomierz Confession (Confessija Sandomierska) (1570), Second Helvetic Confession (1562), Heidelberg Catechism (1563). These are in Lithuanian and Polish language. The Sandomierz Confession was based on the Second Helvetic Confession and adopted by the Polish-Lithuanian General Synod, and was approved later by the Evangelical Reformed Church of Lithuania. The Great Gdansk Agenda (1637) is a liturgical book approved and adopted by the Unitas Lithuaniae.

International organisations 
The church is a member of the World Communion of Reformed Churches and has fraternal relationships with the Reformed Church in Hungary, the Church of Lippe.
Denominational member of the World Reformed Fellowship.

Churches 
In Lithuania, churches can be found in Biržai, Vilnius, Papilys, Kaunas, Nemunėlio Radviliškis, Švobiškis, Šiauliai, Panevėžys, Kėdainiai, Salamiestis, Kelmė.

See also 
Religion in Lithuania

References

External links
 

Reformed denominations in Europe
Christian denominations in Lithuania
Members of the World Reformed Fellowship
Members of the World Communion of Reformed Churches